Netherlands competed at the 2020 Winter Youth Olympics in Lausanne, Switzerland from 9 to 22 January 2020.

Medalists

Ice hockey

Short track speed skating

Three skaters achieved quota places for Netherlands based on the results of the 2019 World Junior Short Track Speed Skating Championships.

Boys

Girls

Snowboarding

Halfpipe, Slopestyle, & Big Air

Speed skating

Four skaters achieved quota places for Netherlands based on the results of the 2019 World Junior Speed Skating Championships.

Boys

Girls

Mass Start

Mixed

See also
Netherlands at the 2020 Summer Olympics

References

2020 in Dutch sport
Nations at the 2020 Winter Youth Olympics
Netherlands at the Youth Olympics